Vincent Barrett Price (born August 30, 1940) is an American poet, human rights and environmental columnist, editor, reporter, publisher, and teacher. His most recent works include the poetry volumes Polishing the Mountain, or Catching Balance Just in Time: Selected Poems 2008–2020, Innocence Regained: Christmas Poems, and Memoirs of the World in Ten Fragments, and the nonfiction book The Orphaned Land: New Mexico's Environment Since the Manhattan Project. He is the co-founder, with Benito Aragon, of the New Mexico Mercury, an online platform featuring news, commentary and analysis from a variety of experts and writers around New Mexico. Since January 2017, the Mercury Messenger has featured Price's online column of politics and the environment. Price has taught off and on since 1976 in the University of New Mexico's School of Architecture and Planning, and as continuing faculty in the UNM Honors College from 1986 to 2014. His seminars range from the classics in translation to modern poetry, urban studies, and New Mexico's environmental history. He is currently an elected member of the Board of Directors for the Leopold Writing Program. In 2021, he received the New Mexico Literary Arts Gratitude Award "for contributions to the life of the poetry community in New Mexico and the Southwest."

Biography 
Price was born on August 30, 1940, in Los Angeles, California, the only son of actor Vincent Price (1911–1993) and his first wife, actress Edith Barrett (1907–1977). He moved to New Mexico in 1958, escaping Hollywood's celebrity culture, and came to identify with the state, its isolation and eccentricity, and its people, landscape, architecture, and traditional cultures. He graduated from the University of New Mexico in 1962 with a B.A. in anthropology. That same year he published his first poem and began a lifelong writing practice. He first visited Chaco Canyon in 1961 and published his seminal work of poetry, Chaco Body, with photographer Kirk Gittings in 1992. After graduate school he worked as a reporter, and in 1971 he began a weekly column in New Mexico that has run almost continuously to the present. In 1969 Price married the artist Rini Price. They lived in the same house and worked the same land in Albuquerque's North Valley until Rini's death in 2019; Price still lives there today. In 2007, Price's selected poems from 1966 to 2006, Broken and Reset, were published by UNM Press. In 2016, he received an honorary degree, Doctor of Letters (Litt. D), from his alma mater. He continues to write poetry, nonfiction, and his ongoing weekly column about politics and the environment.

Writing 
Price's poetry and prose have been published in more than 70 national and international publications since 1962. He was the architecture editor for Artspace Magazine of Albuquerque and Los Angeles, and the former editor of New Mexico Magazine. Price was the city editor for the New Mexico Independent (print publication) and worked for the publication through the 1970s. He was the founding editor of Century Magazine, which ran from 1980 to 1983. He was an architecture critic at the Albuquerque Journal in the mid-1980s. He was also weekly columnist and regular  contributor to The Albuquerque Tribune from 1978 until the newspaper closed in 2008. Price was an editorial contributor to the New Mexico Independent (online publication) from 2008 to 2009. He was the series editor of the Mary Burritt Poetry Series at the University of New Mexico Press from 2004 to 2012. As an editor, he has brought the work of more than 500 New Mexican authors, poets, and scholars into print.

In November 2011, UNM Press published Price's book The Orphaned Land: New Mexico's Environment Since the Manhattan Project.  In the book, Price analyzes fifty years of newspaper articles and government reports to reveal the environmental toll which New Mexico has paid for decades of military munitions testing, uranium mining, and population growth: unsustainable development, air and water pollution by multinational corporations and undue strain on the state's limited water supply, to name a few.  Framing New Mexico as "a microcosm of global ecological degradation," Price explores the impacts and systematic breaches of public trust by some of the pervading power structures affecting the environment around the world: the military-industrial complex, multinational corporation's impact on local natural resources, and the lack of consideration of long-term environmental consequences in development planning.  Speaking with Gene Grant on KNME's New Mexico In Focus, Price states that the Manhattan Project both transformed and deformed the American West. It elevated New Mexico into one of the intellectual and scientific epicenters of the Cold War, but it also resulted in 2,100 waste sites at Los Alamos National Laboratories in northern New Mexico and 400 waste sites at Sandia National Laboratories in Albuquerque. Marc Simmons of the Santa Fe New Mexican calls the book "a stellar compendium focused on the state's slide toward ecological degradation."

Casa Urraca Press of Abiquiu, NM, published Price's second volume of selected poems, Polishing the Mountain, or Catching Balance Just in Time: Selected Poems 2008–2020 in 2021. This volume compiles largely new and unpublished work, both individual poems (such as “Chaco Nights,” the latest of his Chaco poems) and large suites (such as Homeric America and the Museum Poems). It also excerpts previously published work, including Memoirs of the World, Rome MMI, and Price’s Christmas poems. In the Introduction, he writes, “The title of this book—Polishing the Mountain—comes from a prayer cycle I call Badger Ethics, a sequence of admonishments in answer to the plea ‘What do I do now?’ that has evolved into a daily and calming meditative recitation. Trying to learn what to overlook, struggling to keep focused on what matters, catching myself when I fail to see purpose and order as the ‘refuge of now,’ and polishing away so I won’t forget to ‘worry not,’ as the Badger admonished, has been for me like rubbing a smooth stone endlessly all over the surface of the Sandia Mountains with no expectation of results.”

Price also published the poetry collection Innocence Regained: Christmas Poems with Casa Urraca Press in 2020. This book compiles fifty years' worth of his most intimate, inquisitive, and inspired work. In 1969, he wrote a small poem called "Christmas License," which he gave to his friends and loved ones for the holiday. "I've written such 'occasional' poems every Christmas ever since, usually under strenuous time constraints," Price writes in the Introduction. "Family and friends have said they cheer them up. So I kept on writing them, and will keep on as long as the years permit." Innocence Regained collects 43 of those poems, published together for the first time. "Christmas Poems is an astonishing gift to us, a collection of poems lived and journeyed, to be spoken, chanted, and sung," writes New Mexico poet laureate Levi Romero. "They made me ponder, question, and appreciate the mundane of the everyday, every season, every year. And especially how the journeyman poet magnifies and explodes the poems to expose the hidden gems and wonders of our lives." The book was listed as a finalist in the Poetry category in the 2021 New Mexico/Arizona Book Awards.

Price's extended poetic sequence, entitled Memoirs of the World in Ten Fragments, was published in 2018 by Wings Press of San Antonio, Texas. What interests Price in Memoirs of the World, quoting his Introduction, is not his own specific life but "what I have witnessed of the imagination in my practice as a poet, what I have witnessed of the world as a journalist and non-fiction writer, and what I have witnessed of the will to love and the will to destroy." Critic William Peterson writes, "Price has composed ... an impassioned memoir of the world, a scorched collective memory of our entire human aspiration—and our calamity."

Recognition 
2021 – Recipient of the New Mexico Literary Arts Gratitude Award
2021 – Elected to the Board of Directors for the Leopold Writing Program
2016 – Honorary Degree, Doctor of Letters (Litt. D.), University of New Mexico
2016 – Paul Bartlett Ré Peace Prize of the University of New Mexico, Lifetime Achievement Award
2014 – Top of the Rockies Award, First Place, Environmental Enterprise Reporting Online
2006 – Bravo Award for Excellence in Literary Arts from the Arts Alliance
2004 – Price's book, Albuquerque: A City At The End of the World, won the Fray Francisco Atanasio Dominguez Award for Historic Survey and Research 
2003 – Citizen Planner of the Year award by the American Planning Association of New Mexico
2002 – Erna S. Fergusson Award, UNM Alumni, "for touching the minds of many and for service the University of New Mexico and to the greater community"
1999 – Humanist of the Year Award by the Humanist Society of New Mexico
1996 – ACLU-NM First Amendment Award for excellence in journalism
1989 – Friend of the Environment Award by the New Mexico Conservation Voters Alliance
1989 – UNM Centennial Distinguished Alumni award
1985 – Governor's Award for Historic Preservation in New Mexico
1984 – Award of Merit from the New Mexico Society of Architects for architectural criticism
1975 – Governor's Cultural Properties Review Committee's award for his "penetrating provocative editorials in defense of New Mexico's cultural environment"

Books 
The Cyclops Garden (1969), San Marcos Press
Semblances (1976), Sunstone Press
Monsters (1982), with Vincent Price, Grosset and Dunlap
Chaco Body (1992), photographs by Kirk Gittings, Artspace Press
Albuquerque: A City at the End of the World (1995, 2003), UNM Press
Anasazi Architecture and American Design (1996), co-editor with Baker Morrow, UNM Press
The 7 Deadly Sins (1997), La Alameda Press
Chaco Trilogy (1998), La Alameda Press
The Oddity (2004), UNM Press 
Myth Waking: Homeric Hymns: A Modern Sequel (2004), St. Elizabeth Street Press
In Company: An Anthology of New Mexico Poetry Since 1960 (2004), co-editor, UNM Press
Death Self (2005), paintings by Rini Price, Wingspread
Canyon Gardens: The Ancient Pueblo Landscape of the American Southwest (2006), co-edited with Baker Morrow, UNM Press
Broken and Reset: Selected Poems 1966-2006 (2007), UNM Press
The University of New Mexico (2010), photographs by Robert Reck, UNM Press
The Orphaned Land: New Mexico's Environment Since the Manhattan Project (2011), photographs by Nell Farrell, UNM Press
ROME MMI (2016), photographs by Jan Schmitz, Blurb
Memoirs of the World in Ten Fragments (2018), Wings Press
Innocence Regained: Christmas Poems (2020), foreword by Zach Hively, Casa Urraca Press
Polishing the Mountain, or Catching Balance Just in Time: Selected Poems 2008–2020 (2021), Casa Urraca Press
Lucretius and the Logic of Venus (2023), Casa Urraca Press

Television 
In the 1989 opening episode of KNME's ¡Colores! series, Price interviews Godfrey Reggio about the film Koyaanisqatsi.
In a 1993 episode of KNME's ¡Colores! series, Price reads from his book Albuquerque: A City at the End of the World and expands on the past, present, and future of the city in videotaped interviews. Price continued intermittently to host ¡Colores! episodes in the 1990s, including an interview of architectural historian Rina Swentzell of Santa Clara Pueblo.
In October 2011, Price was interviewed by Gene Grant for the KNME produced New Mexico In Focus. The interview revolved around Price's recently published book, The Orphaned Land: New Mexico's Environment Since the Manhattan Project.
In January 2021, Price appeared on KNME's ¡Colores! series to discuss dying and coming back to life, as well as reading from his unpublished poem "Travel Notes on Coming Back to Life" and "Reversing the Fall" from Innocence Regained: Christmas Poems.

Poetry readings 
Price has a long history of poetry performances in New Mexico and the West, from 1969 at the Living Batch bookstore in Albuquerque to online readings in 2020 through Bookworks in Albuquerque and Collected Works in Santa Fe. He has read at more than 100 venues, including St. John's College, Santa Fe, the University of Albuquerque, the University of New Mexico, Tome on the Range in Las Vegas, New Mexico, Beyond Baroque in Venice, California, and in multiple bars, cantinas, classrooms, and public spaces. Price was part of a series of video readings shot by Allan and Gloria Graham from 2003 to 2005 called Add-Verse, which featured poets such as Robert Creeley, Anne Waldman, Diane di Prima, and Michael McClure reading poems while the camera focused only on their hands.

In March 2010, Price was videotaped while reading from a variety of his published and unpublished poems at Acequia Booksellers in Albuquerque's North Valley.

Personal life 
Price was born in Los Angeles, where he went to public schools in Santa Monica and West LA. He has lived in Albuquerque's North Valley for more than 50 years, running and walking the acequias, managing an acre and a half of trees, weeds, and gardens, and building a collection of rocks and shells and natural oddities. He married the artist Rini Price in 1969, and the couple began collaborating in the early 1970s. Rini created the covers for the majority of his books of poetry, and they worked together at Century Magazine. They have two sons, Jody Price, who lives with his wife Amy in Santa Fe, New Mexico, and Keir Price who lives with his wife Helena in Jupiter, Florida, and two grandchildren, Ryan and Talia Price. The Prices traveled frequently to what they called the “high alone” in Colorado, Wyoming, and Montana and the desert of southern New Mexico. Rini Price died in 2019.

References

1940 births
Living people
American male poets
20th-century American poets
21st-century American poets
Poets from California
Writers from Los Angeles
Poets from New Mexico
University of New Mexico alumni
University of New Mexico faculty
20th-century American male writers
21st-century American male writers